Julian Frank Schmitz (September 15, 1881 – July 5, 1943) was an American gymnast and track and field athlete who competed in the 1904 Summer Olympics. In 1904 he won the silver medal in the team event. He was also 32nd in gymnastics' triathlon event, 57th in gymnastics' all-around event and 101st in athletics' triathlon event.

References

External links
Julian Scmitz's profile at databaseOlympics

1881 births
1943 deaths
Gymnasts at the 1904 Summer Olympics
Olympic silver medalists for the United States in gymnastics
American male artistic gymnasts
Medalists at the 1904 Summer Olympics